The weightlifting competition at the 1972 Summer Olympics in Munich consisted of nine weight classes, all for men only. Two new weight classes were introduced at these Games (flyweight and super heavyweight), marking the first changes to the Olympic program since 1952. This was the last year that the clean and press was included as one of the lifts.

Medal summary

Medal table

References

Sources
 

 
1972 Summer Olympics events
1972